Crespadoro is a town in the province of Vicenza, Veneto, north-eastern Italy. It is north of SP31 provincial road, in the Chiampo Valley of the Venetian Prealps.

References

External links
(Google Maps)

Cities and towns in Veneto